Karawala Airport  is an airstrip serving the village of Karawala in the South Caribbean Coast Autonomous Region of Nicaragua.

See also

 List of airports in Nicaragua
 Transport in Nicaragua

References

External links
 HERE Maps - Karawala
 OpenStreetMap - Karawala
 OurAirports - Karawala
 

Airports in Nicaragua